Anna Catherine Constance Vasa (7 August 1619 in Warsaw – 8 October 1651 in Cologne) was a Polish princess, daughter of Sigismund III Vasa, King of Sweden and Poland and his second wife Constance of Austria.

Life

After the successive deaths of her mother (1631) and father (1632), and in order to secure her upkeeping according to her rank, in 1632 the parliament bestowed her with the counties of Brodnickie, Gołubskie and Tucholskie, which previously had belonged to her mother; however, she only came into possession of them when she came of age in 1638.

Since 1637, a marriage was suggested between Anne Catherine Constance and Ferdinand Charles, Archduke of Austria, heir of Tyrol and nephew of Ferdinand II, Holy Roman Emperor. Despite arrangements in 1639 and 1642, the marriage never actually took place, because of the age of Ferdinand Charles and because of disagreement about the amount of dowry.

Frederick William, Elector of Brandenburg, and Gaston, Duke of Orléans (brother of King Louis XIII of France), were also candidates for her hand. However, Anne Catherine Constance finally married Philip William, heir of the Count Palatine of Neuburg and later Elector Palatine, in Warsaw on 8 June 1642. She brought a considerable dowry in jewels and cash, calculated at a total of 2 million thalers. On 18 July 1645 she gave birth her only child, a son, who died the same day.

She died childless in Cologne and was buried in the church of the Jesuits in Düsseldorf.

Ancestors

Gallery

Notes

Polish princesses
1619 births
1651 deaths
Anna Catherine Constance
Electresses of the Palatinate
Daughters of kings
17th-century Polish women
17th-century Polish people